Mystification is the sixth studio album by American heavy metal band Manilla Road, released in 1987. It was re-released in 2000 on Sentinel Steel Records. 

The album was inspired by the work of Edgar Allan Poe.

Critical reception
AllMusic wrote that "bandleader Mark Shelton's stirring guitar work often comes to the rescue, spinning beautiful melodic yarns across the near epic 'Children of the Night' and the Haley's Comet-inspired 'Dragon Star', while additional album standouts such as 'Spirits of the Dead' and the title track finally display the clever combination of melodic savvy and compelling oft-spiritual lyrics to get them through."

Track listing

 "Haunted Palace" – 4:23
 "Spirits of the Dead" – 4:24
 "Valley of Unrest" – 3:41
 "Mystification" – 5:35
 "Masque of the Red Death" – 5:21
 "Up From the Crypt" – 3:02
 "Children of the Night" – 6:55
 "Dragon Star" – 5:56
 "Death by the Hammer" – 3:45

 The 2000 re-release has a different track list, and includes the song "The Asylum" as the tenth track.

Credits
Manilla Road
 Mark Shelton – lead vocals, guitars
 Scott Park – bass guitar
 Randy Foxe – backing vocals, drums and percussion

Production
Paul Zaleski - producer
Larry Funk - co-producer, edit
Manilla Road - producer, arranger, edit, concept 
L. Ryan Hendricks - concept, artwork

References

Manilla Road albums
1987 albums